This is the bibliography of American fantasy and science fiction writer Brandon Sanderson.

Cosmere 
Many of Sanderson's works are set on different planets in an overarching universe known as the Cosmere. They are often subtly connected, with some characters appearing across the various series.

Novels

Short works

Graphic novels

Alcatraz

Cytoverse

The Wheel of Time 
Sanderson was selected to continue Robert Jordan's fantasy series The Wheel of Time after his death by his editor and widow Harriet McDougal.

Legion 
Legion is a series of novellas centered around Stephen Leeds as he investigates different mystery cases.

The Reckoners

Other works

References

Print sources 
 

Bibliographies by writer
Bibliographies of American writers
Fantasy bibliographies
 
Science fiction bibliographies